The Torture of Silence is a 1917 French silent drama film directed by Abel Gance.

Cast
 Emmy Lynn as Manon Berliac
 Firmin Gémier as Emile Berliac
 Armand Tallier as François Rolland
 Anthony Gildès as Jean
 Paul Vermoyal as Jean Dormis
 Gaston Modot
 Antonin Carène
 Antonin Artaud

Reception
Like many American films of the time, the French film The Torture of Silence was subject to cuts by city and state film censorship boards. The Chicago Board of Censors issued an Adults Only permit and required a cut in reel 2 of the last scene with the nude boy with sex visible.

References

External links

1917 films
1917 drama films
French drama films
1910s French-language films
French silent feature films
French black-and-white films
Films directed by Abel Gance
Silent drama films
1910s French films